Pseudohypatopa is a genus of moths in the family Blastobasidae. The genus was described by Sinev in 1986.

Species
 Pseudohypatopa anthracographa (Meyrick, 1937)
 Pseudohypatopa longicornutella Park, 1989
 Pseudohypatopa longitubulata H. Zhen & H. H. Li, 2008
 Pseudohypatopa paulilobata H. Zhen & H. H. Li, 2008
 Pseudohypatopa pulverea
 Pseudohypatopa beljaevi
 Pseudohypatopa ramusella Adamski & H. H. Li, 2010

References

 , 2010: Three new species of Blastobasinae moths from Beijing, China (Lepidoptera: Gelechioidea: Coleophoridae). SHILAP Revista de Lepidopterologica 38 (151): 341-351.
 , 2008, A review of Pseudohypatopa Sinev (Lepidoptera: Coleophoridae: Blastobasinae: Holcocerini), with descriptions of two new species, Entomologica Fennica 19 (4): 241-247.

Blastobasidae genera